Sericoda quadripunctata is a species of ground beetle in the family Carabidae. It is found in Europe and Northern Asia (excluding China) and North America.

References

Further reading

External links

 

Harpalinae
Articles created by Qbugbot
Beetles described in 1774
Taxa named by Charles De Geer